Edward Hagerman was a Canadian author and professor at York University. He was born May 18, 1939 in Zealand Station, New Brunswick, to Howard and Mary Hagerman.  He wrote many works on military strategy, most notable being The American Civil War and the Origins of Modern Warfare: Ideas, Organization, and Field Command. He died in the earliest hours of June 14, 2016 at Toronto General Hospital.

References 

1939 births
2016 deaths
Canadian non-fiction writers
Academic staff of York University
Writers from New Brunswick